Josephus Daniels (May 18, 1862 – January 15, 1948) was an American diplomat and newspaper editor from the 1880s until his death, who controlled Raleigh's News & Observer, at the time North Carolina's largest newspaper, for decades. A Democrat, he was appointed by President Woodrow Wilson to serve as Secretary of the Navy during World War I. He became a close friend and supporter of Franklin D. Roosevelt, who served as his Assistant Secretary of the Navy and later was elected as United States president. Roosevelt appointed Daniels as his U.S. Ambassador to Mexico, serving from 1933 to 1941. Daniels was a vehement white supremacist and segregationist. Along with Charles Brantley Aycock and Furnifold McLendel Simmons, he was a leading perpetrator of the Wilmington insurrection of 1898.

As Secretary of the Navy, Daniels handled policy and formalities in World War I while his top aide, Roosevelt, handled the major wartime decisions. After the Mexican Revolution, as ambassador to Mexico, Daniels dealt with the anti-American government and its expropriation of American oil investments. In North Carolina in the early 20th century, he had been a leading progressive, supporting public schools and public works, and calling for more regulation of trusts and railroads. He supported prohibition and women's suffrage, and used his newspapers to support the regular Democratic Party ticket.

Daniels believed that "the greatest folly and crime" in U.S. history was giving "Negroes" the vote. He and his newspaper "championed the white supremacy cause in frequent news reports, vigorously worded editorials, provocative letters, and vicious front page cartoons that called attention to what the newspaper called the horrors of 'negro rule.'" Daniels argued that as long as African Americans had any political power, they would block progressive reforms.

He was highly influential in the state legislature's passage in 1900 of a suffrage amendment that effectively disenfranchised most blacks in the state, excluding them from the political system for decades until the late 20th century. They were also excluded from juries and subject to legal racial segregation.

Early life and career
Josephus Daniels was born in 1862 to a shipbuilder and his wife in Washington, North Carolina, located on the Pamlico River in Beaufort County. The state had seceded from the Union in 1861. Before the boy was 3, his father was killed by a Confederate sharpshooter, because of his well-known Union sympathies. The father was attempting to leave with Federal forces evacuating Washington, N.C. during the Civil War. Young Daniels moved with his widowed mother and two siblings to Wilson, North Carolina. He was educated at Wilson Collegiate Institute and at Trinity College (now Duke University).

Daniels edited and eventually purchased a local newspaper, the Wilson Advance.  Within a few years, he became part owner, along with his brother Charles, of the Kinston Free Press and the Rocky Mount Reporter.  He studied law at the University of North Carolina (today the University of North Carolina at Chapel Hill) and was admitted to the bar in 1885, but did not practice law.

After becoming increasingly involved in the North Carolina Democratic Party and taking over the weekly paper Daily State Chronicle, Daniels served as North Carolina's state printer from 1887 to 1893. He was appointed as chief clerk of the Federal Department of the Interior under Grover Cleveland in 1893–95.

Marriage and family

In 1888, Daniels married Addie Worth Bagley. She was the granddaughter of former Governor Jonathan Worth. They had four sons: Josephus, Worth Bagley, Jonathan Worth, and Frank A. Daniels II. Jonathan followed his father into public service, serving as a special assistant and, briefly, White House Press Secretary to President Franklin D. Roosevelt in the 1940s.

The News and Observer
In 1894, with the financial assistance of industrialist Julian S. Carr, also a white supremacist, Daniels acquired a controlling interest in Raleigh's News & Observer, and left his federal position. Under his leadership, the paper was a strong advocate for the Democratic Party, which at the time was struggling to maintain its power in the state against a fusion of the Republicans and Populists.

According to Daniels in his autobiography, "The News and Observer was relied upon to carry the Democratic message and to be the militant voice of White Supremacy, and it did not fail in what was expected." Daniels printed numerous articles intended to stoke fears of black men as rapists of white women. A lone white woman noticing a black man in her vicinity would be written up in the paper as a narrowly avoided rape. Daniels also argued that achieving political office emboldened black men to commit more outrages against white women. He hired cartoonist Norman E. Jennett to spread his message among the 25% of white voters who were illiterate. Daniels admitted later that actual assaults committed by black men on white women were very few in number. However his newspaper coverage had the desired effect of winning Populists over to the Democratic Party. Newspapers were sold at cost to the Democratic Party, which distributed them to white voters. According to historian Helen Edmonds, the paper "led in a campaign of prejudice, bitterness, vilification, misrepresentation, and exaggeration to influence the emotions of the whites against the Negro." The result was the only successful coup d'état in American history, the overthrow of an elected government by force in the Wilmington insurrection of 1898. In the Findings of the Wilmington Race Riot Commission, Daniels is the only name mentioned as a cause of the insurrection.

The white supremacy campaign led to Democratic victories in 1898 and 1900. Having regained control of the state legislature, the Democrats passed a suffrage amendment raising barriers to voter registration, which affected most African Americans in the state. The political exclusion was maintained into the late 1960s. Later in life, while discussing his success, "Daniels admitted that the paper was occasionally excessive in its bias toward Democrats and that stories were not fully researched before publication and probably could not be 'sustained in a court of justice.'" He supported a number of progressive causes, such as public education and anti-child-labor laws. As Secretary of the Navy, he banned the consumption of alcohol aboard U.S. naval vessels.

Daniels never apologized for using the newspaper to encourage white supremacist violence in 1898. In his memoir, he spoke positively about the actions of Red Shirts and   how his white supremacy campaign had crushed "Negro domination". The News and Observer remained under Daniels' family control until 1995, when it was sold to The McClatchy Company. In 2006 the newspaper published an editorial apologizing for its role in the Wilmington insurrection of 1898 and consequent massacre.

Secretary of the Navy
Daniels supported native Southerner Woodrow Wilson in the 1912 presidential election. After Wilson's victory, he was appointed as Secretary of the Navy.

 
Secretary Daniels held the post from 1913 to 1921, throughout the Wilson administration, overseeing the Navy during World War I. Franklin D. Roosevelt, a future US president, served as his Assistant Secretary of the Navy.
 

 
Daniels believed in government ownership of armor-plate factories, and of telephones and telegraphs. At the end of the First World War, he made a serious attempt to have the Navy permanently control all radio transmitters in the United States. If he had succeeded amateur radio would have ended, and it is likely that radio broadcasting would have been substantially delayed.

Teetotaler Daniels banned alcohol from United States Navy ships in General Order 99 of June 1, 1914. (After the end of Prohibition in 1933, ship commanders determined that alcohol continue to be banned on board ship but that limited access to beer be maintained for sailors with 45 days or more of service on their records. Limited access to harder alcoholic beverages by officers to be distributed at their discretion was subsequently maintained for use on shore during official leave from onboard duty.)

In 1917, Secretary Daniels determined that no prostitution would be permitted within a five-mile radius of naval installations. In New Orleans, this World War I directive resulted in the shutting down of brothels in Storyville. It had long-lasting consequences for servicemen and others during subsequent decades.

On March 15, 1919, Daniels issued General Order No. 456, prohibiting all forms of work on the Christian Sabbath (Sunday). He ordered,

In order to insure a proper observance of the Lord's Day in the Navy of the United States, and to provide the officers and men with rest and recreation so essential to efficiency, the following order will be carry out: Hereafter all commanding officers and others officially concerned will see to it that aboard ships and on shore stations to which they are attached, no work of any character whatsoever is performed except works of necessity. This order will be construed and embracing target practice, and drills of every character, inspection of ship and crew, clothing inspection, issuing of small stores, and all other ship activities that violate the letter and spirit of this order. No vessel of the Navy shall begin cruise on Sunday except in case of emergency ...

During World War I, Daniels created the Naval Consulting Board to encourage inventions that would be helpful to the Navy. Daniels asked Thomas Edison to chair the Board, as the Secretary was worried that the US was unprepared for the new conditions of warfare and needed new technology. Additionally, Daniels was the first Secretary of the Navy to sponsor naval aviation. He established the first naval air station at the Pensacola Navy Yard, claiming "aircraft must form a large part of our naval force for offensive and defensive operations".

The Newport Sex Scandal erupted due to a Navy sting operation, overseen by Assistant Secretary of the Navy Franklin D. Roosevelt, that was conducted in 1919. Begun as an attempt to clean up what was seen as "immoral conditions" at Naval Station Newport, it expanded to investigations of the civilian population in Newport. It resulted in the arrests for homosexual activity of some 17 sailors and a prominent Episcopal Navy chaplain, with imprisonment imposed for some. When the tactics used in the sting operation became known, it attracted national news coverage. Congress undertook an investigation, resulting in both Secretary Daniels and Roosevelt being rebuked by a Congressional committee. The report called FDR's behavior "reprehensible," and said that the actions "violated the code of the American citizen and ignored the rights of every American boy who enlisted in the Navy to fight for his country."

Daniels published The Navy and the Nation (1919), which was primarily a collection of war addresses he had made as Secretary of the Navy.

Later life
After leaving government service in 1921, Daniels resumed the editorship of the Raleigh News and Observer.
Daniels strongly supported Democrat Franklin D. Roosevelt for president in 1932.

Ambassador to Mexico
President Roosevelt appointed Daniels as United States Ambassador to Mexico, a post he held from 1933 to 1941. Roosevelt expected Daniels to help carry out his "Good Neighbor Policy" in Latin America. But Daniels' arrival in Mexico City was marred by a violent demonstration when a group of Mexicans stoned the American Embassy.

Roosevelt appointed Daniels in order to heal the rift caused by the U.S. invasion of Mexico during its civil war. Daniel's speeches and policies while serving as Ambassador to Mexico are believed to have improved US-Mexican relations. He praised a proposed Mexican plan for universal popular education and, in a speech to US consular officials, advised them to refrain from interfering too much in the affairs of other nations. Daniels also saw the reforms of President Lázaro Cárdenas as analogous to Roosevelt's New Deal. He particularly supported Cardenas's expropriation of large landowners, over the objections of the State Department. This support also translated into support for the Farm Security Administration back home. Daniels, along with John A. Ferrell, was also instrumental in obtaining support for the Rockefeller Foundation's Mexican Agriculture Program, which influenced the later Green Revolution.

Anti-Catholicism
American Catholics bitterly attacked Daniels for failing to oppose the virulent attacks on the Catholic Church by the Mexican government during and after its revolution. Daniels was a staunch Methodist, and worked with Catholics in the U.S., but had little sympathy for the Church in Mexico. He believed that it represented the landed aristocracy, which stood opposed to his version of liberalism.   In Mexico, the main issue was the government's efforts to shut down Catholic schools; Daniels publicly approved these attacks and praised anti-Catholic Mexican politicians. In a July 1934 speech at the American Embassy, Daniels praised the anti-Catholic efforts that had been led by the former president, Plutarco Elías Calles:

General Calles sees, as Jefferson saw, that no people can be both free and ignorant. Therefore, he and President Rodriguez, President-elect Cardenas and all forward-looking leaders are placing public education as the paramount duty of the country. They all recognize that General Calles issued a challenge that goes to the very root of the settlement of all problems of tomorrow when he said: 'We must enter and take possession of the mind of childhood, the mind of youth.'

However Daniels also warned the Mexicans they should not be so harsh against the Church.

Return to North Carolina
In 1941, his son, Jonathan, was named a special assistant to Roosevelt. At that time, Daniels resigned his ambassadorial post in Mexico to return to North Carolina. There he resumed the editor's post at the News & Observer, and continued his outspoken editorial style.

Daniels published several recollections of his years in public office. In addition to The Navy and the Nation, he wrote Our Navy at War (1922), The Life of Woodrow Wilson (1924), and The Wilson Era (1944).

Daniels and his son Jonathan were passengers on Franklin Roosevelt's 1945 funeral train from Raleigh until Roosevelt's burial at his home of Springwood in Hyde Park, New York. The father and son rode the train back to Washington, D.C. in the company of widow Eleanor Roosevelt and the new president, Harry S. Truman.

During the course of his life, Daniels operated several newspapers, culminating with the News & Observer, which is still in operation. He served in public office with a strong belief in improving conditions for labor and the working class. The story of Daniels' life closely mirrors that of North Carolina during the same time period. From the catastrophe of Civil War to national prominence, Daniels was a prime example of the strengths and weaknesses that marked the progress of his state. In 1941, he retired to Raleigh due to his wife's poor health; she died in 1943.

After completing a five-volume autobiography, in which he expressed regret over his vicious attacks (but not the overall righteousness) of the white-supremacy campaign of the late 19th century, Daniels died in Raleigh on January 15, 1948, at the age of eighty-five. He is buried in Historic Oakwood Cemetery of that city. Daniels divided his shares of the News and Observer among all his children and Jonathan became editor. The family retained control until it sold the paper in 1995.

Josephus Daniels had a cousin, younger by 11 years, John T. Daniels, the Coast Guard member assigned to the Kill Devil Life-Saving Station in 1903, who took the famous photo of the Wright brothers in humanity's first ever successful piloted airplane flight, with Orville at the controls of the Wright Flyer.

Legacy and honors
According to historian John Milton Cooper:

In 1956, the new Daniels Middle School in Raleigh was named after him. On June 16, 2020, the Wake County Board of Education voted unanimously to rescind the naming of the school and to rename it Oberlin Middle School. Daniels Hall on North Carolina State University's main campus was also named after him. On June 22, 2020, the NC State Board of Trustees voted to rename Daniels Hall. Chancellor Randy Woodson said "Josephus Daniels had strong ties to white supremacy and played a leading role in the Wilmington insurrection of 1898. The building’s name had served as a constant reminder of a shameful part of our state’s history." Until future renovations are completed, the building has been temporarily denoted "Beat Navy Hall" in recognition of the strong partnerships with the US Army and the academic departments within the building.
 
His home, Wakestone, is now a National Historic Landmark.  It was used as a Masonic Temple before its demolition in August 2021.

A statue of Daniels formerly stood in Nash Square in Raleigh. It was removed on June 16, 2020, after the murder of George Floyd and subsequent widespread civil unrest. Members of the Daniels family approved of the removal.

In fiction
In Harry Turtledove's "Southern Victory" series of alternate history novels, Daniels was US Secretary of the Navy during the timeline's analog of World War I, and the US Navy named a destroyer escort after him during the series's version of World War II.

Selected works
 1919 — The Navy and the Nation. New York: George H. Doran Company.  OCLC 1450710
 1922 — Our Navy at War. Washington, D.C.: Pictorial Bureau.  OCLC 1523367
 1924 — The Life of Woodrow Wilson, 1856–1924. Philadelphia: Universal Book and Bible House. OCLC 4894794. reprint by Kessinger Publishing, 2004. ; OCLC 81967751
 1939 — Tar Heel Editor. Chapel Hill: University of North Carolina Press. OCLC 335116
 1941 — Editor in Politics. Chapel Hill: University of North Carolina Press. OCLC 339245
 1944 — The Wilson Era: Years of Peace, 1910–1917. Chapel Hill: University of North Carolina Press.  OCLC 750810 (1944 edition); OCLC 63786963 (1946 edition)
 1946 -- The Wilson Era: Years of War and After, 1917–1923, Volume 4. Chapel Hill: University of North Carolina Press.
 1947 — Shirt-sleeve Diplomat. Chapel Hill: University of North Carolina Press.

Notes

Further reading

 Cronon, E. David. (1960).   Josephus Daniels in Mexico. (University of Wisconsin Press). 
  on his leadership of white racism
 
 Gerber, Larry G. The Limits of Liberalism: Josephus Daniels, Henry Stimson, Bernard Baruch, Donald Richberg, Felix Frankfurter and the Development of the Modern American Political Economy (1984)
  
 Morrison, Joseph L. Josephus Daniels: The Small-d Democrat (University of North Carolina Press 1966), scholarly biography
 
 Thelander, Theodore A. "Josephus Daniels and the Publicity Campaign for Naval and Industrial Preparedness before World War I," North Carolina Historical Review (1966) 43#3 pp 316–332.
 Williams, William J. "Josephus Daniels and the U.S. Navy's Shipbuilding Program during World War I," Journal of Military History (1996) 60#1 pp 7–38.
 Zogry, Kenneth. "Josephus Daniels" in Howard Cappy. Covington, and Marion A. Ellis, eds (2002).  The North Carolina Century: Tar Heels who Made a Difference, 1900-2000. Charlotte, North Carolina: Levine Museum of the New South. ; OCLC 50124471

Primary sources
 
 
 Kittredge, Tracy Barrett. (1921).  Naval Lessons of the Great War: A Review of the Senate Naval Investigation of the Criticisms by Admiral Sims of the Policies and Methods of Josephus Daniels. Garden City, New York: Doubleday, Page & Company. OCLC 1900437

External links

 
 
Detailed 1916 Article on Daniels with photos
Guide to the Josephus Daniels Letter and Address 1939, 1943
"Josephus Daniels" from the North Carolina Encyclopedia, The State Library of North Carolina
Life of Woodrow Wilson by Josephus Daniels
North Carolina Election of 1898

2006 Report of the 1898 Wilmington Race Riot Commission
Daniel E. Worthington: Daniels, Josephus, in: 1914-1918-online. International Encyclopedia of the First World War.

1862 births
1948 deaths
19th-century American newspaper publishers (people)
Ambassadors of the United States to Mexico
American newspaper publishers (people)
American people of World War I
American white supremacists
Burials at Historic Oakwood Cemetery
Duke University Trinity College of Arts and Sciences alumni
History of racism in North Carolina
Politicians from Raleigh, North Carolina
People from Wilson, North Carolina
Political violence in the United States
The News & Observer
Candidates in the 1924 United States presidential election
20th-century American politicians
United States Secretaries of the Navy
University of North Carolina School of Law alumni
Woodrow Wilson administration cabinet members
North Carolina Democrats
Businesspeople from Raleigh, North Carolina
Progressivism in the United States
People from Washington, North Carolina
Wilmington insurrection of 1898
People born in the Confederate States